An explosion is a rapid expansion in volume associated with an extreme outward release of energy, usually with the generation of high temperatures and release of high-pressure gases.  Supersonic explosions created by high explosives are known as detonations and travel through shock waves.  Subsonic explosions are created by low explosives through a slower combustion process known as deflagration.

Causes

Explosions can occur in nature due to a large influx of energy. Most natural explosions arise from volcanic or stellar processes of various sorts. Explosive volcanic eruptions occur when magma rises from below, it has very dissolved gas in it. The reduction of pressure as the magma rises and causes the gas to bubble out of solution, resulting in a rapid increase in volume. Explosions also occur as a result of impact events and in phenomena such as hydrothermal explosions (also due to volcanic processes). Explosions can also occur outside of Earth in the universe in events such as supernovae. Explosions frequently occur during bushfires in eucalyptus forests where the volatile oils in the tree tops suddenly combust.

Astronomical 

Among the largest known explosions in the universe are supernovae, which occur after the end of life of some types of stars. Solar flares are an example of a common, much less energetic explosion on the Sun, and presumably on most other stars as well. The energy source for solar flare activity comes from the tangling of magnetic field lines resulting from the rotation of the Sun's conductive plasma. Another type of large astronomical explosion occurs when a very large meteoroid or an asteroid impacts the surface of another object, such as a planet. For example, the Tunguska event of 1908 is believed to have resulted from a meteor air burst.

Black hole mergers, likely involving binary black hole systems, are capable of radiating many solar masses of energy into the universe in a fraction of a second, in the form of a gravitational wave. This is capable of transmitting ordinary energy and destructive forces to nearby objects, but in the vastness of space, nearby objects are usually rare. The gravitational wave observed on 21 May 2019, known as GW190521, produced a merger signal of about 100 ms duration, during which time is it estimated to have radiated away 9 solar masses in the form of gravitational energy.

Chemical
The most common artificial explosives are chemical explosives, usually involving a rapid and violent oxidation reaction that produces large amounts of hot gas. Gunpowder was the first explosive to be invented and put to use. Other notable early developments in chemical explosive technology were Frederick Augustus Abel's development of nitrocellulose in 1865 and Alfred Nobel's invention of dynamite in 1866. Chemical explosions (both intentional and accidental) are often initiated by an electric spark or flame in the presence of oxygen. Accidental explosions may occur in fuel tanks, rocket engines, etc.

Electrical and magnetic

A high current electrical fault can create an 'electrical explosion' by forming high energy electrical arc which rapidly vaporizes metal and insulation material. This arc flash hazard is a danger to people working on energized switchgear. Excessive magnetic pressure within an ultra-strong electromagnet can cause a magnetic explosion.

Mechanical and vapor
Strictly a physical process, as opposed to chemical or nuclear, e.g., the bursting of a sealed or partially sealed container under internal pressure is often referred to as an explosion. Examples include an overheated boiler or a simple tin can of beans tossed into a fire.

 Boiling liquid expanding vapor explosions are one type of mechanical explosion that can occur when a vessel containing a pressurized liquid is ruptured, causing a rapid increase in volume as the liquid evaporates. Note that the contents of the container may cause a subsequent chemical explosion, the effects of which can be dramatically more serious, such as a propane tank in the midst of a fire. In such a case, to the effects of the mechanical explosion when the tank fails are added the effects from the explosion resulting from the released (initially liquid and then almost instantaneously gaseous) propane in the presence of an ignition source. For this reason, emergency workers often differentiate between the two events.

Nuclear

In addition to stellar nuclear explosions, a nuclear weapon is a type of explosive weapon that derives its destructive force from nuclear fission or from a combination of fission and fusion. As a result, even a nuclear weapon with a small yield is significantly more powerful than the largest conventional explosives available, with a single weapon capable of completely destroying an entire city.

Properties

Force

Explosive force is released in a direction perpendicular to the surface of the explosive. If a grenade is in mid air during the explosion, the direction of the blast will be 360°. In contrast, in a  shaped charge the explosive forces are focused to produce a greater local explosion; shaped charges are often used by military to breach doors or walls.

Velocity
The speed of the reaction is what distinguishes an explosive reaction from an ordinary combustion reaction. Unless the reaction occurs very rapidly, the thermally expanding gases will be moderately dissipated in the medium, with no large differential in pressure and no explosion. As a wood fire burns in a fireplace, for example, there certainly is the evolution of heat and the formation of gases, but neither is liberated rapidly enough to build up a sudden substantial pressure differential and then cause an explosion. This can be likened to the difference between the energy discharge of a battery, which is slow, and that of a flash capacitor like that in a camera flash, which releases its energy all at once.

Evolution of heat
The generation of heat in large quantities accompanies most explosive chemical reactions. The exceptions are called entropic explosives and include organic peroxides such as acetone peroxide. It is the rapid liberation of heat that causes the gaseous products of most explosive reactions to expand and generate high pressures. This rapid generation of high pressures of the released gas constitutes the explosion. The liberation of heat with insufficient rapidity will not cause an explosion. For example, although a unit mass of coal yields five times as much heat as a unit mass of nitroglycerin, the coal cannot be used as an explosive (except in the form of coal dust) because the rate at which it yields this heat is quite slow. In fact, a substance that burns less rapidly (i.e. slow combustion) may actually evolve more total heat than an explosive that detonates rapidly (i.e. fast combustion). In the former, slow combustion converts more of the internal energy (i.e. chemical potential) of the burning substance into heat released to the surroundings, while in the latter, fast combustion (i.e. detonation) instead converts more internal energy into work on the surroundings (i.e. less internal energy converted into heat); c.f. heat and work (thermodynamics) are equivalent forms of energy. See Heat of Combustion for a more thorough treatment of this topic.

When a chemical compound is formed from its constituents, heat may either be absorbed or released. The quantity of heat absorbed or given off during transformation is called the heat of formation. Heats of formations for solids and gases found in explosive reactions have been determined for a temperature of 25 °C and atmospheric pressure, and are normally given in units of kilojoules per gram-molecule. A positive value indicates that heat is absorbed during the formation of the compound from its elements; such a reaction is called an endothermic reaction. In explosive technology only materials that are exothermic—that have a net liberation of heat and have a negative heat of formation—are of interest. Reaction heat is measured under conditions either of constant pressure or constant volume. It is this heat of reaction that may be properly expressed as the "heat of explosion."

Initiation of reaction

A chemical explosive is a compound or mixture which, upon the application of heat or shock, decomposes or rearranges with extreme rapidity, yielding much gas and heat. Many substances not ordinarily classed as explosives may do one, or even two, of these things.

A reaction must be capable of being initiated by the application of shock, heat, or a catalyst (in the case of some explosive chemical reactions) to a small portion of the mass of the explosive material. A material in which the first three factors exist cannot be accepted as an explosive unless the reaction can be made to occur when needed.

Fragmentation
Fragmentation is the accumulation and projection of particles as the result of a high explosives detonation. Fragments could originate from: parts of a structure (such as glass, bits of structural material, or roofing material), revealed strata and/or various surface-level geologic features (such as loose rocks, soil, or sand), the casing surrounding the explosive, and/or any other loose miscellaneous items not vaporized by the shock wave from the explosion. High velocity, low angle fragments can travel hundreds of metres with enough energy to initiate other surrounding high explosive items, injure or kill personnel, and/or damage vehicles or structures.

Notable examples

Chemical
 1626 Wanggongchang Explosion 
 1887 Nanaimo mine explosion 
 1917 Halifax Explosion 
 1917 Battle of Messines 
 1921 Oppau explosion 
 1944 Bombay explosion
 1944 Port Chicago disaster 
 1944 RAF Fauld explosion 
 1947 Cádiz Explosion 
 1947 Texas City disaster 
 1960 Nedelin catastrophe
 1969 Soviet N1 rocket explosion
 1974 Flixborough disaster
 1998 PEPCON disaster, Henderson, Nevada
 1988 Poole explosion
 1994 Port Neal fertilizer plant explosion
 2001 AZF (factory)
 2004 Ryongchon disaster
 2005 Hertfordshire Oil Storage Terminal fire
 2008 Gërdec explosions
 2009 Cataño oil refinery fire
 2013 West Fertilizer Company explosion
 2015 Tianjin explosions
 2020 Beirut explosion

Nuclear
 Trinity test
 Ivy Mike
 Castle Bravo
 Tsar Bomba
 Atomic bombings of Hiroshima and Nagasaki

Volcanic

 Santorini
 Krakatoa
 Mount St. Helens
 Mount Tambora
 Mount Pinatubo
 Toba catastrophe theory
 Yellowstone Caldera

Stellar
 List of supernovae

Etymology
The modern meaning developed later:
 Classical Latin: "to drive an actor off the stage by making noise" hence meaning "to drive out" or "to reject"
In English:
 Around 1538: "drive out or off by clapping" (originally theatrical)
 Around 1660: "drive out with violence and sudden noise"
 Around 1790: "go off with a loud noise"
 Around 1882: first use as "bursting with destructive force"

See also

References